Werner Catel (27 June 1894 – 30 April 1981), Professor of Pediatrics at the University of Leipzig,  was one of three doctors considered an expert on the programme of euthanasia for children and participated in the Action T4 "euthanasia" programme for the Nazis, the other two being Hans Heinze and Ernst Wentzler.

Action T4
In early 1939, a farm labourer called Richard Kretschmar requested Catel's permission to euthanise one of his children, now identified as Gerhard Kretschmar, who had been born blind and deformed. Catel deferred the matter and suggested the father write directly to Hitler for permission. Hitler subsequently sent Dr. Karl Brandt to confer with Catel and decide on a course of action. On July 25, 1939 the child was killed. 

The T4 program was influenced by a popular book, Allowing the destruction of life unworthy of living, written in 1920 by Alfred Hoche and Karl Binding. Catel, as part of this programme, was probably influenced by it too. In his 1962 publication, Grenzsituation des Lebens (Border situations of life), Catel argued for the reintroduction of euthanasia. As had Binding and Hoche, Catel identified three possible types of euthanasia.

Reine Euthanasie:
"Real" euthanasia was seen as the killing of a person who was suffering from so much pain, that an ever-increasing amount of pain-reducing drugs had to be administered. This consequently led to the person's death.

Euthanasie im engeren Sinne:
The killing of a patient whose illness "according to medical experience" is so bad "that there is no hope of recovery", but whose death is also not to be expected in the near future. (See terminal sedation)

Euthanasie im weiteren Sinne:
The "extermination of the life of an "idiot child" or an adult in a similar condition. Catel defined "idiot children" as being "such monsters ... which are nothing but a massa carnis".

Postwar career
After the war Catel took charge of the Mammolshöhe Children's Mental Home near Kronberg, where he continued to rally for the euthanasia of children deemed beyond hope.  In 1949 he was found to have committed no grave crimes by a denazification board in Hamburg, and became attached to the University of Kiel in 1954.  There was serious discussion after his death in 1981 of establishing a Werner Catel Foundation with $200,000 from his estate, but the idea was finally dismissed in 1984.

See also
Alfred Hoche
Karl Binding
Life unworthy of life

References

 Hans-Christian Petersen und Sönke Zankel. Werner Catel - ein Protagonist der NS-"Kindereuthanasie" und seine Nachkriegskarriere. In: Medizinhistorisches Journal. Medicine and the Life Sciences in History 38 (2003), S. 139-173.
 Hans-Christian Petersen und Sönke Zankel: "Ein exzellenter Kinderarzt, wenn man von den Euthanasie-Dingen einmal absieht." - Werner Catel und die Vergangenheitspolitik der Universität Kiel. In: Hans-Werner Prahl u. a. (Hrsg.): Uni-Formierung des Geistes. Universität Kiel und der Nationalsozialismus. Kiel 2007, Bd. 2, S. 133-179.
 Ernst Klee: Deutsche Medizin im Dritten Reich, S. Fischer Verlag Frankfurt/M., Oktober 2001 (Besprechung auf graswurzel.net)
 Manfred Müller-Küppers: Die Geschichte der Kinder- und Jugendpsychiatrie unter besonderer Berücksichtigung der Zeit des Nationalsozialismus kinderpsychiater.org
 Ortrun Riha: Das schwerbehinderte Kind als ethische Verantwortung. Die Bürde der Vergangenheit als Verantwortung für die Zukunft. In: 110 Jahre Universitätsklinik und Poliklinik für Kinder und Jugendliche in Leipzig. Basel 2003, S. 17 ff.
 Joachim Karl Dittrich: Rechtfertigungen? Betrachtungen zu drei Buchveröffentlichungen Werner Catels. In: 110 Jahre Universitätsklinik und Poliklinik für Kinder und Jugendliche in Leipzig. Basel 2003, S. 27 ff.
 Berit Lahm, Thomas Seyde, Eberhard Ulm: Kindereuthanasieverbrechen in Leipzig. Verantwortung und Rezeption. Plöttner Verlag, Leipzig 2008, .

External links
Books by and about Catel in the German National Bibliography
Page on Catel in the Faculty Catalog of the University of Leipzig
Beitrag von Udo Benzenhöfer Article by Udo Benzenhöfer (PDF, 162 kB) In: German Medical Journal, Vol 97, Issue 42, October 20, 2000
interview with Catel in Der Spiegel, 19.02.1964
article on Catel in Der Spiegel 8/24/1960

1894 births
1981 deaths
Physicians in the Nazi Party
German eugenicists
Nazi eugenics
Aktion T4 personnel